San José Chiapa is a town and municipality in Puebla in south-eastern Mexico.

Audi has a car factory near the town, with a capacity of 150,000 units per year, including the Q5. Engines are imported from Germany. Most of the finished cars are transported by rail, but 13-17 trucks per day are also used. About half of the cars are exported to Europe through Veracruz, while  Lázaro Cárdenas is used for cars and parts to United States, China and India.

References

Municipalities of Puebla